Warren Moon (born 27 May 1982) is an Australian association football manager and former player who most recently served as manager of A-League club Brisbane Roar.

Biography
Moon completed his schooling at Marist College Rosalie in Brisbane and joined the Brisbane Strikers from 2003 in the National Soccer League (NSL). He played in the 2003 and 2004 seasons before the NSL was superseded by the Australian A-League. Moon was signed by Queensland Roar for the 2005 inaugural A-League season. He played with the Queensland Roar, where he made 14 appearances and scored 2 goals.

At the end of the 2005 season, Moon travelled to Scotland to trial with Hibernian.

When Moon was not offered a contract with Hibernian, he signed with Queen of the South on 31 August 2006. Moon then returned to Australia after struggling with injury and signed as a coach/player for Brisbane Premier League First Division team Eastern Suburbs in 2008.

Moon took charge of Eastern Suburbs in the Brisbane Premier League Division 1 for 2008. In his first full year of coaching he took the club from 10th the previous year to champions, on the way making it to the Premier Cup Grand Final where they were beaten on penalties by Peninsula Power. 2009 Moon signed for the Brisbane Strikers in the Queensland state league. After securing the 2009 QSL champions medal, Moon signed for the 2009 Brisbane Premier League champions Peninsula Power.

In 2012 Moon was appointed head coach along with longtime friend and player Scott Macnicol. At the end of the 2014 season he was offered head coach of Queensland Lions, where he once trained with the Queensland Roar. Moon also coached the Anglican Church Grammar School First XI, with his last season at the school being in 2019.

Warren Moon was head coach of the First XI at Anglican Church Grammar School. In 2019, he coached the school to their first GPS Football premiership.

Brisbane Roar
Moon left the school after accepting an offer to become the new General Manager of the Brisbane Roar Academy in 2019.

On 16 July 2020 the Roar appointed Moon to the A-League head coaching role replacing interim coach Darren Davies after winning just 3 games in his 18 match spell.

Managerial statistics

References 

1982 births
Living people
Sportspeople from Gravesend, Kent
Australian soccer players
Australian expatriate soccer players
A-League Men players
National Soccer League (Australia) players
Scottish Football League players
Brisbane Strikers FC players
Queen of the South F.C. players
Brisbane Roar FC players
Association football midfielders
A-League Men managers
Brisbane Roar FC managers